Borassodendron is a genus of flowering plant in the family Arecaceae. It contains two species, native to Southeast Asia.

Species
 Borassodendron borneense J.Dransf. - Borneo
 Borassodendron machadonis  (Ridl.) Becc. - southern Thailand, southern Myanmar, Peninsular Malaysia

References

 
Arecaceae genera
Taxa named by Odoardo Beccari
Taxonomy articles created by Polbot